Richard Blunt may refer to:
Richard Blunt (bishop) (1833–1910), British bishop
Richard Blunt (priest), Archdeacon of Totnes, 1265
Sir Richard David Harvey Blunt, 11th Baronet (1912–1975), of the Blunt baronets
Richard Blunt (MP), Member of Parliament (MP) for Newcastle-under-Lyme

See also
Richard Blount (disambiguation)
Blunt (surname)